Yaffa may refer to:
 Jaffa, the southern, oldest part of Tel Aviv-Yafo, an ancient port city in Israel

People with the name
 Sami Yaffa, a bass guitarist
 Yaffa Eliach
Yaffa Mambe, soccer player

See also
 Yafa Yarkoni